Nelson Mandela was the first post-apartheid president of South Africa.

Nelson Mandela may also refer to:
 Nelson Mandela: A Biography, a 1999 book by Martin Meredith
 Nelson Mandela (EP), a 2013 EP by Zahara
 "Free Nelson Mandela" or "Nelson Mandela", a 1984 protest song by The Specials / The Special AKA
 Statue of Nelson Mandela (Washington, D.C.), a sculpture by Jean Doyle

See also 
 Mandela (disambiguation)
 Nelson Mandela Children's Fund
 Nelson Mandela Institution
 Nelson Mandela School (disambiguation)
 UniSA Nelson Mandela Lecture